Zutphen is a railway station located in Zutphen, Netherlands. The station was opened on 2 February 1865, rebuilt after the Second World War and is located on the Arnhem–Leeuwarden railway, Zutphen–Glanerbeek railway, Amsterdam–Zutphen railway and the Zutphen–Winterswijk railway. The services are operated by Nederlandse Spoorwegen, Syntus and Arriva. The station is an important regional hub, with three local lines and one express line meeting in Zutphen.

Train services

Bus services

External links
 NS website 
 Arriva website 
 Dutch Public Transport journey planner 

Railway stations in Gelderland
Railway stations opened in 1865
Railway stations on the Staatslijn A
Railway stations on the Staatslijn D
Railway stations on the Oosterspoorweg
Zutphen